The Indiana Territorial Capitol, also known as the Indiana Territory State Memorial and Legislative Hall, is part of a state historical site in Vincennes, Indiana. Part of a row of buildings located across from Vincennes University, the building was the center of government for the Indiana Territory from 1800 to 1813.  It was built between 1800 and 1805, and is a simple two-story frame building.  It was moved to its present site in 1949.

The building was added to the National Register of Historic Places in 1973. It is located in the Vincennes Historic District.

See also
List of the oldest buildings in Indiana

References

External links

 Vincennes State Historic Sites - official site, visiting information including Indiana Territorial Capitol

History museums in Indiana
Indiana State Historic Sites
Museums in Knox County, Indiana
Government buildings on the National Register of Historic Places in Indiana
Government buildings completed in 1805
Vincennes, Indiana
National Register of Historic Places in Knox County, Indiana
Individually listed contributing properties to historic districts on the National Register in Indiana